

Wald is the German word for forest.

Surname 
 Wald (surname)

Places

Austria
Wald am Schoberpass, in Styria
Wald im Pinzgau, in Salzburger Land

Germany
Wald, Baden-Württemberg
Wald, Upper Palatinate, in the district of Cham, Bavaria
Wald (Allgäu), in the district of Ostallgäu, Bavaria

Switzerland
Wald, Appenzell Ausserrhoden
Wald, Bern
Wald, Glarus 
Wald, Zürich

United States
Wald, Alabama
Wald, Iowa

Other
 Wald test, a test in statistics
We Almost Lost Detroit, a 1975 Reader's Digest book by John G. Fuller
 WALD, an American radio station
 Wald, a techno/dub/glitch album by Pole